The 1988 NFL draft was the procedure by which National Football League teams selected amateur college football players. It is officially known as the NFL Annual Player Selection Meeting. The draft was held April 24–25, 1988, at the Marriot Marquis in New York City, New York. The league also held a supplemental draft after the regular draft and before the regular season.

With the first overall pick of the draft, the Atlanta Falcons selected linebacker Aundray Bruce. Notably, the first player selected at the quarterback position did not come until the third round (68th overall) with Tom Tupa (by the Phoenix Cardinals), who was also selected because of his ability as a punter. This is the last draft in which the first quarterback was selected this late.  In fact, only one draft since – 1996 – has gone without a quarterback being drafted in the first round.

Player selections

Round one

Round two

Round three

Round four

Round five

Round six

Round seven

Round eight

Round nine

Round ten

Round eleven

Round twelve

Hall of Famers
 Michael Irvin, wide receiver from Miami, taken 1st round 11th overall by Dallas Cowboys
Inducted: Professional Football Hall of Fame class of 2007
 Randall McDaniel, offensive guard from Arizona State, taken 1st round 19th overall by Minnesota Vikings
Inducted: Professional Football Hall of Fame class of 2009
 Thurman Thomas, running back from Oklahoma State, taken 2nd round 40th overall by Buffalo Bills
Inducted: Professional Football Hall of Fame class of 2007
 Dermontti Dawson, center from Kentucky, taken 2nd round 44th overall by Pittsburgh Steelers
Inducted: Professional Football Hall of Fame class of 2012
 Tim Brown, wide receiver from Notre Dame, taken 1st round 6th overall by Los Angeles Raiders
Inducted: Professional Football Hall of Fame class of 2015

Notable undrafted players

References

External links
 NFL.com – 1988 Draft
 databaseFootball.com – 1988 Draft
 Pro Football Hall of Fame

National Football League Draft
NFL Draft
Draft
NFL Draft
NFL Draft
American football in New York City
1980s in Manhattan
Sporting events in New York City
Sports in Manhattan